Sadda ( Sada) is a city in Kurram District in the Khyber Pakhtunkhwa province of Pakistan. Located on the Kurram River, it is a big trade market for the people of Lower Kurram and Central Kurram. The main tribe living in Sadda is the Bangash.

Etymology
Sadda or Sadeh literary means "hundred", and is the name of an ancient Iranian winter festival, traditionally celebrated by kindling fires. The festival falls 40 days after the winter solstice, and 50 days before the March equinox or Nowruz, i.e. on or around 30 January.

Demographics

Sadda is inhabited by Pashtuns who speak Pashto. The main Pashtun tribes are the Bangash and Orakzai. Other large tribes are the Alisherzai, Mamozai, and Mangal. Being a trading point, it bustles with business activity attracting customers and traders from all over Kurram District. It is now a diverse multi-tribe city. During the Taliban insurgency, Sadda was home to many Taliban leaders before the Pakistan Army took control of the city.

Sadda is a very fast-growing city, which doubled its population between 1998 and 2017. It is the fourth-largest city in Kohat Division and the 40th largest city in Khyber Pakhtunkhwa. It first was notified and recognized as an urban area between the 1981 and 1998 censuses of Pakistan.

See also 

 List of cities in Khyber Pakhtunkhwa by population
 Kohat Division
 Hangu District
 Doaba
 Hangu
 Tall
 Karak District
 Karak
 Kohat District
 Kohat
 Lachi
 Shakardara
 Kurram District
 Parachinar
 Orakzai District
 Pashto

References

Populated places in Kurram District